Grigoryevka is a rural locality (a khutor) in Krinichanskoye Rural Settlement, Rossoshansky District, Voronezh Oblast, Russia. The population was 228 as of 2010. There are 2 streets.

Geography 
Grigoryevka is located 41 km southeast of Rossosh (the district's administrative centre) by road. Krinichnoye is the nearest rural locality.

References 

Rural localities in Rossoshansky District